Fusidium is a genus of fungi. The bacteriostatic antibiotic fusidic acid is derived from Fusidium coccineum.

References

Sordariomycetes genera